The AMD Optimizing C/C++ Compiler (AOCC) is an optimizing compiler from AMD targeting 32-bit and 64-bit Linux platforms. It is a proprietary fork of LLVM + Clang  with various additional patches to improve performance for AMD's Zen microarchitecture in Epyc and Ryzen microprocessors.

In a May 2017 benchmark comparing AOCC v1.0 to Clang 4 and 5, and GCC 6 through 8, Phoronix found AOCC provided marginal improvement over Clang 4.0 in several benchmarks and no difference in others. Compilation time generally increased relative to Clang 4.0. Some benchmarks found some versions of GCC had better performance than some versions of Clang (AOCC included), and vice versa. In August 2019 Phoronix again benchmarked AOCC, now AOCC 2.0 against Clang 9 and GCC 9.1 and 10.0.

Along with the compiler, AMD offers the AMD Optimizing CPU Libraries (AOCL), a set of numerical libraries that is roughly similar to Intel's Math Kernel Library and includes AMD Math Library (LibM), AMD Random Number Generator Library, AMD Secure RNG Library, AOCL-Sparse, BLIS, FFTW, libFLAME, and ScaLAPACK that are tuned for the Zen processors.

AMD also offers AMD µProf, a performance analysis tool similar to Intel VTune.

See also
 Clang
 Intel C++ Compiler
 List of compilers

References

External links
 

C (programming language) compilers
C++ compilers
Compilers
Fortran compilers
AMD software
2017 software